Vinegret or Russian vinaigrette is a salad in Russian cuisine which is also popular in other post-Soviet states. This type of food includes diced cooked vegetables (red beets, potatoes, carrots), chopped onions, as well as sauerkraut and/or brined pickles. Other ingredients, such as green peas or beans, are sometimes also added. The naming comes from vinaigrette, which is used as a dressing. However, in spite of the name, vinegar is often omitted in modern cooking, and sunflower or other vegetable oil is just used. Some cooks add the brine from the pickled cucumbers or sauerkraut.

Along with Olivier salad and dressed herring, vinegret is served as zakuska on celebration tables in Russophone communities.

Despite the widespread popularity in Russia and Ukraine, the basic mixed salad recipes were adopted from Western European cuisines as late as the 19th century. Originally, the term vinegret denoted any mixture of diced cooked vegetables dressed with vinegar. Later the meaning changed to any mixed salad with beetroots. Modern Russian and Ukrainian cookbooks still mention the possibility of adding mushrooms, meat or fish, but this is rarely practiced.

Similar beetroot-based salads are prepared throughout Northern Europe. Examples are herring salad and beetroot salad in North German and Scandinavian cuisines (see also :de:Heringssalat, :sv:Rödbetssallad), as well as rosolli in Finnish cuisine, with the name for the latter stemming from rassol, the Russian word for brine.

See also 
 List of Russian dishes

References

External links 

 Vinaigrette Recipe, Russian Recipes
 Vinaigrette Recipe with Sauerkraut and Beans
 Vinaigrette Recipe, Natasha's Kitchen
 Vinegret - Russian Beet and Sauerkraut salad

Salads
Russian cuisine
Ukrainian cuisine
Soviet cuisine
Vegetarian dishes of Ukraine